The  1965 Kansas City Chiefs season was the sixth season for the Kansas City Chiefs as a professional AFL franchise and the third in Kansas City; they finished with a 7–5–2 record, third in the Western division.

For the 1965 season, the Chiefs were caught in the middle of the AFL and NFL's bidding wars for college talent. Kansas City made running back Gale Sayers from the University of Kansas their first-round draft pick (sixth overall), but Sayers signed with the Chicago Bears, who had selected him fourth overall in the NFL's draft.

The Chiefs lost running back Mack Lee Hill late in the year when he suffered torn ligaments in his right knee in the next-to-last regular-season game at Buffalo on December 12. Following what was expected to be a routine surgery two days later at Menorah Hospital in Kansas City, Hill died from what was termed "a sudden and massive embolism." Hunt called Hill's death "the worst shock possible." Five days after Hill's unexpected death, the mourning Chiefs defeated the Denver Broncos to finish with a 7–5–2 record.

Schedule

Source: Pro Football Reference

Standings

References 

Kansas City Chiefs seasons
Kansas City Chiefs
Kansas City Chiefs